Chuck Logan (born June 1942, Chicago) is an author of crime drama. He is best known for his series of novels featuring the character Phil Broker, a former police officer and soldier.

His novel Homefront was adapted into a feature film of the same name by Millennium Entertainment.

Works

Novels 

 Hunter's Moon (1996) 
 Phil Broker series:
 The Price Of Blood (1997) 
 The Big Law (1998) 
 Absolute Zero (2002) 
 Vapor Trail (2003) 
 After The Rain (2004) 
 Homefront (2005) 
 South Of Shiloh (2008) 
 Fallen Angel (2013) 
 Broker (2017)

Adaptations 

 Homefront (2013), film directed by Gary Fleder, based on novel Homefront

External links
 
 
Chuck Logan at HarperCollins
Phil Broker at Thrilling Detective

20th-century American novelists
21st-century American novelists
American male novelists
American crime fiction writers
Living people
Novelists from Minnesota
20th-century American male writers
21st-century American male writers
1942 births